The 1936 New Hampshire gubernatorial election was held on November 3, 1936. Republican nominee Francis P. Murphy defeated Democratic nominee Amos Blandin with 56.60% of the vote.

Primary elections
Primary elections were held on September 15, 1936.

Republican primary

Candidates
Francis P. Murphy, former member of the Executive Council of New Hampshire
Eliot A. Carter

Results

General election

Candidates
Major party candidates
Francis P. Murphy, Republican
Amos Blandin, Democratic

Other candidates
Arthur J. Bergeron, Farmer–Labor

Results

References

1936
New Hampshire
Gubernatorial